The Clasica Femenina Navarra is an annual professional road bicycle race for women in Spain.

Winners

External links

References

Cycle races in Spain
Recurring sporting events established in 2019
Women's road bicycle races
Annual sporting events in Spain